Bala Town Football Club is a Welsh football team from Bala, Gwynedd, who play in the Cymru Premier. They play their home games at Maes Tegid.

History
For a full history see; List of Bala Town FC seasons

Although the current Bala Town was formed in 1880, there is record of a football club competing in the 1877–78 Welsh Cup, losing to Corwen after two replays. After Bala North End, Bala South End and Bala Thursday's merged, Bala Town's first available league status record is playing in the Welsh National League (North) Division 2 East in the 1921–22 season. Bala Town moved to their current home, Maes Tegid, in the early 1950s and joined the Wrexham Alliance in 1950, however Bala Town had to wait for more than a century until they were promoted to the second tier of Welsh football, into the Cymru Alliance at the end of the 2003–04 season. After only four seasons in the Cymru Alliance, Bala Town sealed promoted to the Cymru Premier. 

Bala Town secured European football for the first time in their history after a John Irving goal in the 89th minute was enough to see off Port Talbot Town 2–1 to ensure the Lakesiders a European place. Bala Town were drawn against Estonian outfit Levadia Tallinn in the Europa League first qualifying round but after winning the home leg 1–0, they lost 3–1 in the reverse fixture in Tallinn and were eliminated. In the 2014–15 season, the Lakesiders finished second, their highest ever league position, thus qualifying for the 2015–16 UEFA Europa League. Bala Town missed out the opportunity of playing Turkish giants Trabzonspor in the 2015–16 Europa League after losing on aggregate to FC Differdange 03 after falling victim to an injury time Differdange goal, however Bala maintained a proud record of a 100% win percentage at "home", playing at Rhyl's Belle Vue stadium due to UEFA stadium requirements on both occasions, in Europe.

After finishing second in the 2015–16 Cymru Premier they followed this success up by winning their first Welsh Cup, beating The New Saints 2–1 in the final ending their 8 trophy winning streak.

Stadium

Bala Town have played at Maes Tegid in Bala since the 1950s. For European matches they use Rhyl's Belle Vue stadium due to UEFA stadium regulations. They lost a 2021–22 Europa Conference League qualifying match at Park Hall to Sligo Rovers on 8 July 2021.

European record

Notes
 PR: Preliminary round
 1Q: First qualifying round
 2Q: Second qualifying round

Current squad

Honours

Cymru Premier:
Runners-up (3): 2014–15, 2015–16, 2021–22
Welsh Cup
Winners (1): 2016–17
Cymru Premier Cup:
Winners (1): 2022–23
Runners-up (2): 2013–14, 2014–15
Cymru Alliance
Winners (1): 2008–09
Runners-up (2): 2006–07, 2007–08
Welsh National League (Wrexham Area) Premier Division
Winners (1): 2003-04
North East Wales FA Challenge Cup 
Winners (4): 1971–72, 2003–04, 2006–07, 2007–08
North East Wales FA Junior (Horace Wynne) Cup 
Winners (1): 1996–97

References

External links
 
 Welsh Premier Official site – Bala Town page.

 
Cymru Premier clubs
Welsh National League (Wrexham Area) Premier Division clubs
Sport in Gwynedd
Bala, Gwynedd
Cymru Alliance clubs
Welsh National League (North) clubs